Alimamy I.B. Koroma is a Sierra Leonean politician from the All People's Congress (APC) and the current Sierra Leonean Minister of Trade and Industry. He was appointed to the position by president Ernest Bai Koroma in October, 2007.

External links
https://web.archive.org/web/20080828202137/http://www.ernestkoroma.org/cabinet.htm

Year of birth missing (living people)
Living people
Government ministers of Sierra Leone
Temne people
All People's Congress politicians
Place of birth missing (living people)
21st-century Sierra Leonean politicians